This is the episode list of the cooking show Bake with Anna Olson which airs on Food Network Canada in Canada.

Series overview

Season 1 (2012)

Season 2 (2015)

References

Bake